The Austria–Hungary football rivalry is a highly competitive sports rivalry that exists between the national football teams of the two countries, as well as their respective sets of fans. The match-up between Austria and Hungary is the second most-played international in football (only Argentina and Uruguay have met each other in more matches).

Background

Austria and Hungary are neighbours; both were part of the now-defunct Austria-Hungary from 1867 to 1918. Politicians and generals of both leading nations, Austrian Germans and Magyar Hungarians, were responsible for the disastrous foreign policy of the Monarchy that led towards World War I. Thence these two were treated as defeated enemies after World War I by the Allies of World War I. Both shared the experience of seeing millions of nationals having to live in other countries: the Austrians were not allowed to integrate the Germans of Bohemia and Moravia into their republic, the Hungarians had to leave the Magyars of Transylvania to Romania and those north of the Danube to Czechoslovakia (today Slovakia).

According to the Treaty of Versailles, 1919 and the Treaty of Trianon, 1920, Hungary had to cede its westernmost part, called , to Austria, since these districts were inhabited by Germans for centuries.  (now ) would have been the natural capital of the new Austrian State of Burgenland.  Hungary did not agree to relinquish this city, so the Allied powers ordered a referendum, which the Hungarians won. Although many Austrians considered the polls to be irregular, the decision was treated as definitive. The area called Burgenland by the Austrians was handed over to Austria in the autumn of 1921. Even today, Hungarian may be used as an official language in some communities of Burgenland. Hungarian aristocrats like the Esterházys and Batthyánys kept their vast estates in Austria, even after their Hungarian estates were expropriated in 1945.

Kit history

Austria used to play in similar colours to those of the Germany national football team; white jerseys, black shorts, black socks (the Germans wear white ones). In order to distinguish themselves, in 2004 coach Hans Krankl switched to their former away shirts, which have the same colour scheme as Austria's flag, red-white-red. To further distinguish themselves from Germany, the Austrians had used an all-black away kit, but as of 2010, the white shirt and black shorts is used as the away kit. During the 1934 FIFA World Cup match against Germany, the Austrians borrowed a set of light blue tops belonging to SC Napoli for the match, as both teams had white shirts and black shorts.
Hungary's traditional home colours are cherry red shirts, white shorts and green socks. The combination of the colours represent the Hungarian flag. However, the team sometimes wears all white kit even at home. The coat of arms are worn on the left side of the shirt, where the human heart can be found. When the Hungarian players listen to the national anthem of Hungary, Himnusz, they put their arms on to their chest. The national anthem is considered beautiful by Hungarians but many football fans criticize it because of its melancholy which can have an effect on the players. The actual coat of arms could have always been found on the shirt of the national team in contrast with many other national teams which wear the logo of the football federation. Adidas is currently and has been the main designer of the Hungary kits.

Matches

See also
 Austria–Hungary relations
 Austria national football team
 Hungary national football team
 Hungary–Romania football rivalry

References

External links
 at Magyarfutball 
 at Huszadik Század 

International association football rivalries
football
Austria national football team
Hungary national football team
Austria at UEFA Euro 2016
Hungary at UEFA Euro 2016